The United States Powered Paragliding Association (USPPA) is a non-profit organization based in the United States that endeavors to support a segment of ultralight aviation known as powered paragliding.

Founded in 2001, its primary effort is a training program with pilot ratings that recognize different levels of accomplishment. One important part is a tandem program that allows properly rated instructors to teach while flying their students on two seat paramotors.

External links
United States Powered Paragliding Association official site

Aviation organizations based in the United States
Paragliding
Non-profit organizations based in the United States